Carlos A. Bianchi Angleró (born February 10, 1974) is a Puerto Rican politician affiliated with the Popular Democratic Party (PPD). He was elected to the Puerto Rico House of Representatives in 2012 to represent District 20. Bianchi Angleró was appointed by his party to serve as Majority Whip of the Puerto Rico House of Representatives.

References

|-

External links
Carlos Bianchi Profile on WAPA-TV

Living people
1974 births
Popular Democratic Party members of the House of Representatives of Puerto Rico
People from Cabo Rojo, Puerto Rico